The 2022 British Rowing Junior Championships were the 50th edition of the National Junior Championships, held from 17–19 July 2022 at the National Water Sports Centre in Holme Pierrepont, Nottingham 

They are organised and sanctioned by British Rowing, and are open to British junior rowers.

Winners

References

British Rowing Junior Championships
British Rowing Junior Championships
British Rowing Junior Championships
Sport in Nottingham